Anton Olehovych Kanibolotskyi (born 16 May 1988) is a Ukrainian goalkeeper
.
He recently played for the club Shakhtar Donetsk, where he was the third-choice goalkeeper of the club. He started his career at Dnipro Dnipropetrovsk.

Career
He started out in Dnipro in 2005, playing in the reserve squad, before being promoted to the first team to make his league debut in a 1–0 defeat to Tavriya Simferopol on 23 November 2008. He spent time on loan at Kryvbas in 2010. He earned his first call-up to the Ukraine senior team for a 2 June 2010 friendly match against Norway, though he did not play. He was also a member of the Ukraine national under-21 football team. He made 12 appearances for Dnipro.

On 24 July 2012, he agreed a deal to join Shakhtar Donetsk in January 2013 on a free transfer. On 30 July 2012, it was announced that he would instead join Shakhtar immediately on a five-year contract.

On 28 June 2018, Qarabağ announced that they had terminated Kanibolotskyi's contract by mutual consent.

On 17 July 2018, he signed two-year contract with Polish club Miedź Legnica.

Honours
Shakhtar Donetsk (9)
Ukrainian Premier League (3): 2012–13, 2013–14, 2016–17
Ukrainian Cup (3): 2012–13, 2015–16, 2016–17
Ukrainian Super Cup (3): 2013, 2014, 2015

Qarabağ (1)
Azerbaijan Premier League (1): 2017–18

References

External links 
Profile on the Official Dnipro Website
 
 
Official Twitter

1988 births
Living people
Footballers from Kyiv
Ukrainian footballers
Association football goalkeepers
Ukrainian Premier League players
Ukraine under-21 international footballers
FC Dnipro players
FC Kryvbas Kryvyi Rih players
FC Shakhtar Donetsk players
Azerbaijan Premier League players
Ukrainian expatriate footballers
Expatriate footballers in Azerbaijan
Qarabağ FK players
Ukrainian expatriate sportspeople in Azerbaijan
Miedź Legnica players
Ekstraklasa players
Expatriate footballers in Poland
Ukrainian expatriate sportspeople in Poland
FC Karpaty Lviv players
FC Mynai players